The Spiral Staircase is a 2000 television film remake of the 1946 film The Spiral Staircase based on Ethel Lina White's 1933 novel Some Must Watch. The film was directed by James Head with a screenplay by Matt Dorff, and stars Nicollette Sheridan, Judd Nelson, Alex McArthur, Debbe Dunning and Holland Taylor.

Background
The Ethel Lina White novel Some Must Watch was first offered on film in 1946 as The Spiral Staircase. This same title was used for a 1962 television adaptation, 1975 British TV-movie remake, and the 2000 made-for-cable feature.  The 2000 version updated the original story to re-set from the early 20th century to present day.  Filmed on locations in Vancouver and Victoria, Canada, the 2000 version was made for Fox Family network (now Freeform), as a remake of three previous films, still based on Ethel Lina White's novel, and using the same title as the previous films of 1946, 1962, and 1975.

Synopsis

The film centers around Helen Capel (Nicollette Sheridan), a pathologically mute woman who is being stalked by a vicious killer.  Mute since the death of her parents when she was a child, Helen accepts a nursing position on a secluded island in the household of wealthy matriarch Emma Warren (Holland Taylor).  Helen learns that a serial killer is picking off "imperfect" young girls around town, and she fears she is next. A terrible storm hits the island one night and the family and Helen are trapped inside... and they're not alone; the killer is with them in the shadows.

Cast
 Nicollette Sheridan as Helen Capel 
 Judd Nelson as Phillip Warren 
 Debbe Dunning as Danielle 
 Holland Taylor as Emma Warren 
 Christina Jastrzembska as Rachel Parsons 
 William McDonald as Sheriff Bell 
 John Innes as Dr. Porter 
 Margaret Ryan as Mrs. Pritzker 
 Kandyse McClure as Monica 
 Charles Payne as Medical Examiner 
 A.J. Cook as Local Girl 
 Kristina Matisic as Newscaster 
 Alex McArthur as Steven Warren 
 Dolores Drake as Sarah 
 David Storch as Bobby Tyler 
 Lillian Carlson as Mrs. Winfield 
 Brenda Campbell as Elise 
 Dallas Thompson as Linda 
 Katrina Matthews as Cocktail Waitress

Release
The film debuted in April 2000 in the United States, followed by releases in the United Kingdom in May 2000, France in 2001 as Le secret du manoir, Czech Republic in 2003,Germany in 2004 as Stummer Schrei - Und keiner kann dir helfen, Hungary in 2005 and Sweden in 2007.

Reception
In noting that the original 1946 film was "a stellar thriller", Steven Linan of Los Angeles Times found the 2000 remake to be an "inferior remake".

References

External links

2000 television films
2000 films
Remakes of American films
American television films
2000s English-language films
Films set in country houses